Soraikkaiyur is a village in the Papanasam taluk of Thanjavur district, Tamil Nadu, India.

Demographics 
At the 2001 census, Soraikkaiyur had a population of 739 (396 males and 343 females). The sex ratio was 866, and the literacy rate was 65.16%.

References 

Villages in Thanjavur district